Joseph Frank "Otto" Schmidt (November 5, 1926 – September 30, 2000) was a Canadian professional ice hockey player who played two games in the National Hockey League for the Boston Bruins during the 1943–44 season. The rest of his career, which lasted from 1943 to 1952, was spent in various minor leagues.

His brother, Jack Schmidt, also played for the Bruins, playing one season, in 1942. He died on September 30, 2000 in Regina.

Career statistics

Regular season and playoffs

References

External links
 

1926 births
2000 deaths
Boston Bruins players
Boston Olympics players
Canadian ice hockey defencemen
Fort Worth Rangers players
Ice hockey people from Saskatchewan
Seattle Ironmen players
Vancouver Canucks (WHL) players